Bayas may refer to:

 Bayas, a commune in France
 Bayas Islets a group of islands in the Philippines
 Bayas Island, the largest island in the Bayas Islets and also a barangay
 Bayas (river), a river in Spain
 Bayas (Castrillón), a parish in Spain
 Las Bayas, a village in Argentina
 Bayās Ābād, a village in Iran
 Parc Bayas, a sports complex in Haiti